Vučević is a South Slavic surname. Notable people with the surname include:

Borislav Vučević (born 1958), Montenegrin basketball player
Goran Vučević (born 1971), Croatian footballer
Nikola Vučević (born 1990), Montenegrin basketball player
Miloš Vučević (born 1974), Serbian politician

Croatian surnames
Serbian surnames
Montenegrin surnames